Bignonia elegans may refer to:
 Bignonia elegans Cham., a synonym for Tynanthus elegans
 Bignonia elegans Vell., a synonym for Fridericia elegans